Karpa Island is a small island in Aleutians East Borough, Alaska, United States. It lies just south of the Alaska Peninsula's Stepovak Bay. The island has a land area of 1.861 km2 (459.77 acres) and is unpopulated.

External links

National Register of Historic Places listings in Aleutians East Borough, Alaska

References
Karpa Island: Block 2005, Census Tract 1, Aleutians East Borough, Alaska United States Census Bureau

Islands of the Aleutian Islands
Islands of Aleutians East Borough, Alaska
Uninhabited islands of Alaska
Islands of Alaska